is a romance manga by Mitsuru Adachi. It appeared irregularly in the manga magazine Big Comic Original from 1992 through 1997, and was collected in one tankōbon volume in May 1997. In 1998, it was adapted as an 11-episode television drama series by Fuji TV.

Plot
Jinbē is the story of the relationship between Jinpei and his stepdaughter, Miku. Miku's mother died after being married to Jinpei for a little over a year, when Miku was 13 years old, and Jinpei has been raising Miku alone since then. The series has a very delicate touch with the romantic issues. Adachi dealt with a similar situation, a brother and sister who are not related by blood, in his earlier series Miyuki.

Main characters
The information in the "Portrayed by" line is for the live action drama. Additional cast members are listed below in that section.

Portrayed by: Masakazu Tamura
Jinpei, also known as Jinbē (meaning whale shark), lives with his step-daughter Miku. His wife, Rikako, died three years prior to the beginning of the story after being married to him for just over a year. Jinpei works at Sansun Aquarium. While in college, he was a famous goalkeeper for his university's soccer team.

Portrayed by: Takako Matsu
Miku is Jinpei's 17-year-old step-daughter, and the daughter of Rikako and Yukio Miyage. Her parents divorced nine years prior to the story's start, and her mother married Jinpei about five years later. She is in the photography club in high school, and is pursued romantically by Jinishi. However, she was always predestined to have a romantic relationship with her step-father, despite their initial denial throughout the story.

Sources:

Manga
The series has been collected into one tankōbon, published by Shogakukan.

TV Drama
Broadcast on Fuji TV from October 12, 1998 – December 21, 1998, Jinbē garnered an average 15.9% rating. It aired on Monday nights from 9:00—9:54 pm, with the final episode airing from 9:00—10:24 pm.

Cast
Jinbei Takanashi: Masakazu Tamura
Miku Takanashi: Takako Matsu
Makoto Teranishi: Tsuyoshi Kusanagi
Michiko Tsujima: Reiko Takashima
Shūichi Ishizuka: Takashi Ukaji
Yukio Miyage: Kōji Shimizu
Manabu Mitamura: Leo Morimoto
Mayumi Ōzaki: Mayuko Nishiyama
Tomoko Machiyama: Mami Kurosaka
Hiro: Masashi Kōda
Masao Imafuku

Sources:

Staff
Original Story: Mitsuru Adachi
Script: Noriko Yoshida
Music: SR Smoothy Opus One
Executive Producers: Kōzō Nagayama, Tatsuaki Kimura
Producer: Nobuhiro Sugio
Assistant Executive Producer: Masaki Nishiura
Assistant Producer: Chiyoko Asakura
Publicity: Itsuko Onuki
Production Diary: Ryōko Sakuma, Kazuyo Oda
Executive Producer: Masako Tani
Production Chief: Nobuhiro Kayama, Nobuyuki Shintani
Music and Sound Effects: Yoshio Onuki
In cooperation with Kinuta Studio, K&L, Basuku, Active, Two-One, Institute of Cetacean Research, Fennec, FC Plan, Japan Underwater Films, Japan Airlines
Production Undewriting: Fuji TV

Sources:

References

External links
 Official Fuji TV site 
 
 Jinbe at J-Dorama

1992 manga
1998 Japanese television series debuts
1998 Japanese television series endings
Aquariums in fiction
Fuji TV dramas
Japanese television dramas based on manga
Mitsuru Adachi
Seinen manga
Shogakukan manga